Aparna Vaidik (born 22 September) is an Indian historian, author, and educator. Her latest book My Son’s Inheritance: A Secret History of Blood Justice and Lynchings in India, published in January 2020, challenges India's prevailing narrative as an inherently peaceful culture.

Early life
She was born in Indore, Madhya Pradesh.

Writing
Aparna Vaidik's debut book, Imperial Andamans: Colonial Encounter and Island History, was published as part of the Cambridge Imperial and Postcolonial Studies Series of Palgrave Macmillan when she was a historian at Georgetown University in Washington, DC. It examines the penal history of the Andaman Islands. Her second book, My Son’s Inheritance: A Secret History of Blood Justice and Lynchings in India, has drawn international attention.

 Her next book, Waiting for Swaraj: Inner Lives of Indian Revolutionaries is being published by Cambridge University Press and will be out in 2021. Another book on a famous trial of the Indian revolutionaries in during British India, Revolutionaries on Trial: Sedition, Betrayal and Martyrdom, is to be published by Aleph in 2022.

Academic career as a historian
Vaidik earned a bachelor's degree in History from St. Stephen’s College, University of Delhi, Summa Cum Laude. She won the Westcott Memorial Prize, E. R. Kapadia Memorial Prize, Shankar Prasad Memorial Gold Medal, and the Dip Chand Memorial Prize for distinguished work in History. At the University of Cambridge she also studied history for a master's degree, with a thesis on Lord Curzon’s cultural policy that won the Dorothy Foster Sturman Prize. Her PhD in History is from Jawaharlal Nehru University's Centre for Historical Studies. She taught for several years in the University of Delhi and at Georgetown University in Washington, DC, before returning to India to accept a position as the founding faculty member of the history department and programme at Ashoka University. The Indian Council for Historical Research has supported her research with grants, as have Georgetown University, the Charles Wallace Trust, and the Andrew Mellon Foundation.

Philanthropy and public service
Literacy, libraries, and a free, world-class education for all make up an important part of Vadik's public life. Vaidik is the Trustee President of the Rameshwardass Dharmarth Trust that was set up by her maternal grandfather in 1967. The Trust is known widely for its cultural and educational activities and its building ‘Dharam Bhavan’ is local landmark. The Trust has set up a community library for children with The Community Library Project. Since 2016 she has been part of the civil society protests against lynchings and right-wing government policies.

Selected works

Books
 Imperial Andamans: Colonial Encounter and Island History, Cambridge Imperial and Post-Colonial Studies Series of Palgrave Macmillan, 2010: https://www.palgrave.com/gp/book/9780230576056
 My Son’s Inheritance: A Secret History of Blood Justice and Lynchings in India, Aleph, 2020: https://timesofindia.indiatimes.com/times-litfest-2019/speakers/dr-aparna-vaidik/articleshow/71865988.cms
 Waiting for Swaraj: Inner Lives of Indian Revolutionaries, Cambridge University Press, forthcoming 2021.
 Revolutionaries on Trial: Sedition, Betrayal and Martyrdom, Aleph, forthcoming 2022.

Journal articles
 "Rewriting World History in the Classroom: Pedagogical Dispatches from India", Journal of Asian World History (co-authored with Gwen Kelly). 2019.
 "History of a Renegade Revolutionary: Revolutionism and Betrayal in British India", Postcolonial Studies, 2013.
 "Settling the Convict: Matrimony and Family in the Andamans", Studies in History, JNU, 2006.

Personal life
She is married to a cricket coach, and they live in New Delhi with their two sons.

References

External links
University Website
Times of India
Biography at Aleph Book Company
Controversy over teachings
Author page at The Scroll
Most Interesting Books of the Week
Academia page with book reviews

Indian women historians
Living people
English-language writers from India
20th-century Indian historians
21st-century Indian historians
20th-century Indian women writers
21st-century Indian women writers
21st-century Indian writers
Writers from Madhya Pradesh
Delhi University alumni
Alumni of the University of Cambridge
Jawaharlal Nehru University alumni
Year of birth missing (living people)